The Juries Act 1974 (c. 23) is an Act of the Parliament of the United Kingdom. According to its long title, the purpose of the Act is "to consolidate certain enactments relating to juries, jurors and jury service with corrections and improvements made under the Consolidation of Enactments (Procedure) Act 1949." Among others, the Act states who is eligible for jury service in England and Wales, who is disqualified, and who may be excused.

Under the provisions of the Act, any individual is qualified to serve as a juror or be called upon for jury duty in the Crown Court, High Court or county courts if:
they are registered as a parliamentary or local government elector,
they are between the ages of 18 and 75,
they have been ordinarily resident in the United Kingdom, the Channel Islands or the Isle of Man for any period of at least five years since the age of 13, and
they are not otherwise ineligible or disqualified.

Section 17 of the Act allows majority verdicts for the first time in England and Wales: in the Crown Court or High Court, one juror may dissent without resulting in a hung jury if the jury consists of at least ten persons, or two if there are at least eleven; and at least seven must agree in the County Court regardless of size. Normally there are twelve, and the minimum size is eight.

Eligibility and excusal 

A person is liable for jury service if that person:
is registered to vote in parliamentary or local elections
 is aged between 18 and 75 inclusive
 has been resident in the United Kingdom, the Channel Islands or the Isle of Man for a period of at least five years since the age of 13;
 is not disqualified.

The following persons are disqualified from jury service:

A person subject to one of various orders under the Mental Health Act 1983
A person who lacks mental capacity, as defined by the Mental Capacity Act 2005
A person who is on bail in criminal proceedings
A person who has ever been given a prison sentence of at least five years, or an indefinite sentence
A person who has been convicted of one of several offences relating to their conduct as a juror or member of a court martial in the last ten years
A person who has been lawfully imprisoned, or subjected to a suspended prison sentence or one of various types of community order, in the United Kingdom, the Channel Islands or the Isle of Man in the last ten years

A person who has served on a jury, other than in a coroner's court, within the last two years is entitled to be excused. The court also has power to excuse any person who has good reason to be excused, in particular a serving member of the armed forces whose commanding officer certifies that it would be prejudicial to the efficiency of the service for him to be absent from duty. Service may be deferred rather than excused at the court's discretion.

Disqualification before 2004
Until the coming into force of Schedule 33 of the Criminal Justice Act 2003 on 5 April 2004, the following were disqualified:
The judiciary
Those concerned with administration of justice, e.g. policemen, solicitors, barristers, forensic scientists or prison wardens
The clergy, e.g. men in holy orders or regular ministers of any religious denomination
Mentally ill persons subject to various orders
Certain persons subject to imprisonment or probation

Additionally, the following persons could be excused from jury service as of right:

Those aged 76 or over
Members and officers of the Houses of Parliament
Members of the Scottish Parliament and the Scottish Executive
Members of the Welsh Assembly
Members of the European Parliament
The Auditors General for Wales and Scotland
Full-time serving members of the naval, military or air forces
Members of the medical profession, e.g. registered and practising doctors, nurses, dentists or vets
Members of religious orders whose beliefs are incompatible with jury service
Those who have previously served on a jury within the past two years

The Act also states that personation of a juror may result in the trial in which the juror sat being voided; but other irregularities will not, unless the irregularity was objected to as soon as practicable.

See also
Juries Act

References

External links

United Kingdom Acts of Parliament 1974
Acts of the Parliament of the United Kingdom concerning England and Wales
Legal procedure